Stoddart Publishing was a Canadian book publisher and distributor, owned by Jack Stoddart, which ceased operations in 2002.

History
General Publishing purchased Musson in 1967 from Hodder & Stoughton. Stoddart Publishing took over the Canadian publishing line of Musson in 1984.

In 1995, Stoddart published a book by photographer Jock Carroll, Glenn Gould:  Some Portraits of the Artist as a Young Man, being a collection of photographs of the late Canadian pianist, accompanied by captions written by Carroll.  The photographs and narrative were based on an interview with and photos taken by Carroll of Glenn Gould in 1956, at the initiative of Gould's agent. Gould had died in 1982.   Gould's estate and his personal corporation sued Stoddart and Carroll for misappropriation of personality without consent or compensation.  The actions were unsuccessful, based on Gould's unrestricted consent given at the time of the 1956 photo session and interview.

Stoddart Publishing was a subsidiary of General Publishing Co., which filed for bankruptcy protection in 2002.  The bankruptcy affected the majority of the corporate subsidiaries, including Stoddart Publishing.  At the time that Stoddart ceased operations, it was the publisher of a number of notable Canadian writers, including Arthur Black, Pierre Berton, Thomas d'Aquino, Rod McQueen, David Foot, David Suzuki, Walter Stewart and Judy Rebick. As well as publishing the first autobiography of Canadian professional wrestler Bret Hart.

References

Book publishing companies of Canada
Defunct publishing companies of Canada